Franz Josef Johannes Konrad Jung (26 November 1888 – 21 January 1963) was a writer, economist and political activist in Germany. He also wrote under the names Franz Larsz and Frank Ryberg.

He grew up in Neisse (now Nysa) and was a childhood friend of the poet Max Herrmann-Neisse.

He studied music, law and economics in Leipzig, Jena, Breslau and Munich.

From 1909 he worked as a journalist and soon started writing for Der Sturm and Die Aktion. The Austrian psychoanalyst Otto Gross was a large influence upon him.

He was a member of the League for Proletarian Culture (1919–1920). In 1921 he travelled with Jan Appel to participate in the  3rd World Congress of the Comintern in 1921 as a delegate of the Communist Workers Party of Germany (KAPD). Their clandestine transport involved hijacking the SS Senator Schröder, which was bound for fishing grounds near Iceland, to Murmansk, Russia.

He participated in the March Action (March 1921), and escaped to the Netherlands, where he was captured and deported to the Soviet Union. There he worked for the Workers International Relief during the Volga famine.

He died on January 21, 1963, in Stuggart, West Germany.

References

External links

 

1888 births
1963 deaths
People from Nysa, Poland
People from the Province of Silesia
Communist Party of Germany politicians
Communist Workers' Party of Germany politicians
People granted political asylum in the Soviet Union
Council communists